Christine Palamidessi Moore (born in Pittsburgh, Pennsylvania) is an Italian-American writer and novelist.

Life
She graduated from Boston University with a Master of Arts from the Creative Writing Department where she studied with Leslie Epstein, Sue Miller and Richard Elman. She taught writing at the University from 1993 to 2000.

Her work appeared in Andy Warhol's Interview, New Woman Magazine, New Video Magazine, Saturday Evening Post, The New York Times, The Boston Globe, Italian Americana, Aethlon and Stone's Throw. Her memoir, Grandmothers, won a Boston MBTA Monument Award and was engraved on a granite monolith displayed at Jackson Square on Boston's Orange Line.

Her novel, The Virgin Knows, is set in Boston's Italian neighborhood, the North End.

She has been a Senior Editor at Italian Americana since 2000.

Works

Anthologies

Sources 

www.palamidessi.com

External links
"Author's website"

20th-century American novelists
21st-century American novelists
American writers of Italian descent
American women novelists
Boston University College of Arts and Sciences alumni
Writers from Pittsburgh
Year of birth missing (living people)
Living people
20th-century American women writers
21st-century American women writers
Novelists from Pennsylvania